The Nashua Pride was a professional baseball team based in Nashua, New Hampshire, in the United States, not affiliated with Major League Baseball.  They played home games at Holman Stadium from 1998 through 2008, when they were sold and renamed the American Defenders of New Hampshire. In 2010 that team moved to Pittsfield, Massachusetts, and became the Pittsfield Colonials. The franchise itself no longer exists, as the Colonials folded after the 2011 baseball season.

History

The Nashua Pride was one of the founding members of the Atlantic League of Professional Baseball in 1998.  The team name was based on the fact that Money magazine twice named Nashua the "best place to live" in the America. The team's primary home uniform logo was the word "Pride" in script, and included the number "1" inside the capital "P."

In the 2000 season, the team swept the Somerset Patriots in three games to win the Atlantic League Championship Series.  However, the Patriots answered that loss by defeating the Pride in the 2003 and 2005 championships.  Despite their on-field success, the Pride suffered as a result of having one of the lowest average attendances and being the farthest team from the core of the league.

In 2006, the team moved to the Canadian American Association of Professional Baseball, (Can-Am League). As Nashua is closer in proximity to the teams of the Can-Am League than those of the Atlantic, the Pride was relieved of the expensive travel to away games.

In 2007, the Pride won the Can-Am League championship. After that season, long-time manager Butch Hobson left the Pride to take the managerial job with the Southern Maryland Blue Crabs of the Atlantic League, while former Boston Red Sox outfielder Rick Miller was hired as manager in Nashua. Former Boston Red Sox firstbaseman/outfielder Brian Daubach was hired as the hitting coach midway through the 2008 season.

American skier Bode Miller played one home game each year for the team in 2006, 2007, and 2008. Former Red Sox reliever Rich "El Guapo" Garces appeared in the Pride bullpen in 2007 and 2008.

Sale of the Pride

Following the 2008 season, when the Pride lost an estimated $500,000, former owner John Stabile sold the team to the American Defenders of New Hampshire, LLC.  Stabile, a Nashua resident, had bought the team in January 2006 to prevent it from relocating, and got assurances from the new owners that they would keep the team in Nashua.

American Defenders of New Hampshire, LLC consisted of Nokona executives Buddy Lewis and Jerry O'Connor, former Boston Red Sox general manager Dan Duquette, and Terry Allvord.

The new owners changed the club's name from the Nashua Pride to the American Defenders of New Hampshire, placing less of an emphasis on the Nashua market.  They kept General Manager Chris Hall and promoted Brian Daubach from Hitting Coach to Manager.

The team was evicted from Holman Stadium in Nashua midway through the 2009 season because of nonpayment of rent.

Nashua baseball history
The Pride was one of several professional teams to play in Nashua, and one of five to have played at Holman Stadium:
1895: Nashua Rainmakers, New England Association
1901-1905: Nashua, New England League - B
1926-1927:  Nashua Millionaires, New England League - B
1929-1930: Nashua Millionaires, New England League - B
1933: Nashua, New England League - B
1946-1949: Nashua Dodgers, New England League - B
1983: Nashua Angels, Eastern League - AA
1984-1986: Nashua Pirates, Eastern League - AA
1995-1996: Nashua Hawks, North Atlantic League - independent
1998-2005: Nashua Pride, Atlantic League - independent
2006-2008: Nashua Pride, Can-Am League - independent
2009: American Defenders of New Hampshire, Can-Am League - independent

Notable Pride alumni
 Mike Easler (Manager) - 1998
 Brendan Donnelly - 1999
 Curtis Pride - 1999, 2003, 2004
 Sam Horn - 2000, 2001
 Paxton Crawford - 2003
 Dante Bichette - 2004
 Jeff Juden - 2004
 Darren Bragg - 2005
 Orlando Miller - 2005
 Jeff Sparks - 2005
 Rich Garces - 2007, 2008
 Butch Hobson (Manager) - 2000-2007
 Brian Daubach (Hitting Coach) 2008
 Bode Miller - 2006, 2007

References

Canadian American Association of Professional Baseball teams
Former Atlantic League of Professional Baseball teams
Sports in Nashua, New Hampshire
Professional baseball teams in New Hampshire
1997 establishments in New Hampshire
Defunct Atlantic League of Professional Baseball teams
2008 disestablishments in New Hampshire
Defunct independent baseball league teams
Baseball teams established in 1997
Baseball teams disestablished in 2008
Defunct baseball teams in New Hampshire
Baseball teams disestablished in 2011

ja:ナシュア・プライド